Phumzile Van Damme (born 20 July 1983) is a South African consultant and former Member of Parliament representing South Africa’s official opposition, the Democratic Alliance described by the United Nation’s Africa Renewal as a “Young MP with a mission.” She was first elected at the 2014 South African general election and re-elected in 2019. She served as a Whip in the National Assembly and was the Shadow Minister of Communications and Digital Technologies Committee.

On 20 May 2021, Van Damme resigned as a MP. She later revealed that she had resigned because the party had told her to stop criticising Facebook. “I could not do that and compromise my values so I resigned,” tweeted Van Damme.

Van Damme works as an independent consultant on anti-misinformation and communications strategy and digital rights advocacy. In September 2021, she founded and coordinated South Africa’s first electoral disinformation monitoring and combatting project.

Early life
Van Damme was born 20 July 1983 in Manzini, Eswatini to Dr Lynette Sibongile Masuku, a lecturer of Heritage Studies at Sol Plaatjie University and the late Elroy Mayisela, a High School teacher. Van Damme was adopted by her stepfather Hugo Van Damme and her surname changed to his, Van Damme. Shortly after her election to the Parliament of South Africa Van Damme was subjected to a “birthergate,” denying her citizenship as a South African. It was later revealed that she was indeed entitled to South African due to her biological father’s citizenship as a South African and various members of her maternal and paternal line being South African.

Van Damme attended various Primary and High Schools in Eswatini, Belgium and South Africa. She graduated from Rhodes University with a Bachelor of Arts Degree majoring in Political Science and Law.

Political career
Phumzile Van Damme was first elected as a Member of the Parliament of South Africa in 2014. At 31, she was one of the youngest MPs to be elected to Parliament. In the same year, she was appointed the National Spokesperson of South Africa’s official opposition, the Democratic Alliance. She was re-elected as a Member of Parliament in May 2019, and subsequently elected a National Assembly Whip.

Before her election to Parliament Van Damme worked as the Democratic Alliance’s Head of Research and Communications, leading a team of media officers managing communications and research for over 100 MPs. She held various other positions as a political staffer and in 2012 served as the Spokesperson of the now Premier of the Western Cape Alan Winde in his role as the then Minister of Tourism and Economic Development.

As an MP and Shadow Minister of Communications Van Damme pushed for the establishment of the Ad Hoc Committee on the South African Broadcasting Corporation (SABC) - an parliamentary inquiry into years of corruption and political interference at South Africa's public broadcaster. The conclusion of the inquiry ultimately resulted in SABC’s reform and it assuming its role as an independent public broadcaster as intended in the Constitution of South Africa and the dismissal of the then Communications Minister, Faith Muthambi.

As spokesperson of the Democratic Alliance Van Damme led the charge against Bell Pottinger following allegations that it tried to divide and conquer South Africans by stirring racial tensions in a bid to keep South African President Jacob Zuma and his party, the African National Congress (ANC), in power despite ongoing reports of "State Capture" by the Gupta family.

Van Damme submitted a complaint to the Public Relations and Communications Association -  the trade association for the public relations sector in the United Kingdom. The PRCA held a hearing in August 2017 at which Van Damme presented the case against Bell Pottinger. In a unanimous ruling the PRCA found that Bell Pottinger’s had brought industry into disrepute with its actions, and it has received the harshest possible sanction - termination of membership. Two weeks later the PR firm was put into administration after it suffered an exodus of clients and increasing losses in the wake of the scandal over its campaign in South Africa.

In 2020, “Influence” a docu-film directed by Diana Neille and Richard Poplak premiered at the Sundance Film Festival. It documented the rise and fall of Bell Pottinger and Van Damme’s role in its ultimate demise.

In 2020 Van Damme became a member of the International Grand Committee on Disinformation -  an international array of legislators, policy advisors, and other experts who work in collaboration to misinformation, hate speech and electoral interference online on social media. She has spoken on various platforms on the subject of disinformation including the UNDP and the UN Commission on the Status of Women.

On 16 February 2021 Van Damme following the example of her lawmaker counterparts in the United States and some European countries she became the first in Africa to join the call for Facebook to be held accountable for its role in the spread of misinformation and the weaponisation of private data.

She requested that Facebook be summoned to the Parliament of South Africa emphasizing that the aim of questioning Facebook would not be an attempt to exert control or limit freedom of expression on the social media platform, but would be a push for stronger content moderation to remove content that incited violence or advocated hatred that is based on race, ethnicity, gender or religion. She indicated that full freedom of expression that does not fall into these categories must be protected. On 17 February 2021, her fellow members in the Committee on Communications and Digital Technologies acceded to Van Damme’s request and extended to Facebook to appear before the committee.

On 12 May 2021 Van Damme confirmed that Facebook had agreed to meet with the South African Parliament on 25 May 2021 which she described as “historic,” and a “moment on pride for South Africa.” 

In December 2020, the DA parliamentary leader John Steenhuisen made a controversial decision to remove Van Damme from his shadow cabinet, despite her being one of the party’s high performers and replaced her with Zakhele Mbhele. He also extended her three-months' sick leave, which was due to end on 15 December 2020 by another three to 31 March 2021. which he described as a “sabbatical.” Consequently, Van Damme accused Steenhuisen on placing her on a sabbatical she had not requested and trying to use her health to sideline her. She said that she would be challenging Steenhuisen’s decision. She further added that she saw the decision to place her on a sabbatical she did not request as an attempt to control her life and body. The suspicion was that Steenhuisen’s move was in retaliation to her not supporting his candidacy for Leader of the DA and supporting his opponent, Mbali Ntuli. Steenhuisen and DA Chief Whip, Natasha Mazzone denied this insisting that Van Damme has not been sidelined and that she could continue with her parliamentary duties as the sabbatical was optional. Van Damme disputed this and insisted the sabbatical was not made optional and that she was directed by Steenhuisen to cease all her parliamentary duties while on a 3-month sabbatical. She later said she would abide by his instruction, go on sabbatical and legally challenge his decision.

On 12 February 2021, Van Damme announced that her disagreement with Steenhuisen regarding her sabbatical had been resolved and she would return to work, focusing on South Africa’s digital transformation, data privacy, misinformation and digital ethics.

On 20 May 2021, Van Damme resigned as a DA Member of Parliament due to her unhappiness with a “clique of individuals,” in the party. She said that she will not be joining another party nor will she be "attacking" the party. On 21 May, she said that she did not resign as a DA member. She had announced earlier in May that she was in a legal battle with the DA, with some party members determined on punishing her for punching a man in self-defence after he threatened violence during an altercation at the V&A Waterfront in Cape Town in June 2018. On 26 June 2021, Van Damme resigned as a DA member in order for her to focus on 'misinformation monitoring and combatting project' that will be rolled out ahead of the October local government elections. Van Damme reasoned that she needed to be nonpartisan to be able to hold other parties accountable for spreading misinformation.

Awards and accolades

For her work as a political staffer for the Democratic Alliance, in 2013 Van Damme was named as one of South Africa’s Top 200 Young People by Mail and Guardian.

In the first year as an MP Forbes Magazine named her one of 2014’s Top 20 Youngest Power Women In Africa.

In 2019, Van Damme was selected as one of 20 women in the world to be part of the prestigious 2019/20 Vital Voices fellowship. The fellowship aims to “advance women’s public leadership and the UN Sustainable Development Goals (SDGs)” It is a one-year fellowship aimed at increasing the capacity, decision-making power and effectiveness of women leaders in public life while shifting the culture around women’s public leadership and moving towards equality in public representation globally.

In May 2021, Van Damme was selected as part of the 2021/22 Munich Young Leaders Program. The program is a joint project of Körber-Stiftung and the Munich Security Conference brings together 25 outstanding young representatives of governmental institutions, parliaments, think tanks, the media and the private sector from Germany, selected NATO member and partner states, as well as from states of strategic importance in the Asia-Pacific region, the Middle East and Africa. The Munich Young Leaders discuss current issues related to transatlantic foreign and security policy with high-ranking participants of the Munich Security Conference. Besides an individual program, the Munich Young Leaders also take part in the Munich Security Conference.

Personal life
Phumzile Van Damme is married and lives in Cape Town. Her sister is Qiniso Van Damme, a University of Cape Town student, model, actress and South Africa’s first The Bachelorette.

References

External links 

1983 births
Living people
Rhodes University alumni
Members of the National Assembly of South Africa
Democratic Alliance (South Africa) politicians
People from Manzini